Vila Chã is a civil parish in the municipality of Vila do Conde, Portugal. The population in 2011 was 3,094, in an area of 4.81 km².

References

Freguesias of Vila do Conde